Malekoppa may refer to:

Places

Malekoppa, Shimoga - a village in Shimoga district, Karnataka, India
Malekoppa, Koppal - a village in Koppal district, Karnataka, India